Gvoko (also known as Gevoko, Ghboko, Gavoko, Kuvoko, Ngossi, Ngoshi, Ngoshe-Ndhang, Ngweshe-Ndaghan, Ngoshe Sama, Nggweshe) is an Afro-Asiatic language spoken in Borno State, Nigeria and Far North Province, Cameroon.

In Cameroon, Gevoko is spoken in the village of Ngossi, on the border with Nigeria, north of Tourou (Mokolo arrondissement, Mayo-Tsanaga department). It is mainly spoken in Nigeria.

References

Biu-Mandara languages
Languages of Nigeria
Languages of Cameroon